Opequon is an unincorporated community along Opequon Creek in Frederick County, Virginia. Opequon is located on Cedar Creek Grade (VA 622) at Miller Road (VA 620) and also known as Kernstown, Virginia. The community of Opequon was designated a National Historic District in 2002. Opequon School, which was in operation from 1884 to 1934, remains standing on Glass Spring Road in town. Also on Glass Spring Road is the Second Opequon Presbyterian Church. Home to Opequon Quaker Camp on brucetown road.

Opequon Quaker Camp(OQC) is a sleep away summer camp for children ages nine to fourteen; located just north of Winchester, Virginia. It as a part of the Baltimore Yearly Meeting Camps. While it is a quaker camp one does not need to be quaker to attend camp. Children from around the globe have attended this camp (Thailand, PA, MD, D.C., TX). At the camp the children take part in camping trips such as canoeing, backpacking on the Appalachian Trail, rock climbing, and chores. It is a coed camp.

References

Unincorporated communities in Frederick County, Virginia
Unincorporated communities in Virginia